Anne Ainsworth (born 1951 is a former international lawn bowls competitor for Namibia.

Bowls career
In 1993, she won the pairs bronze medal with Cathelean du Plessis, at the inaugural Atlantic Bowls Championships in Florida.

She has represented Namibia at the Commonwealth Games, in the fours event, at the 1994 Commonwealth Games.

References

Namibian bowls players
Bowls players at the 1994 Commonwealth Games
Living people
1951 births